Stargate SG-1 is a military science fiction television series created by Brad Wright and Jonathan Glassner. The series resumes the story of the 1994 Stargate film, where a military team led by Colonel Jack O'Neill and supported by the archeologist Daniel Jackson use an ancient alien artifact called the Stargate to travel to a planet where an alien named Ra oppressed the planet's people by posing as a god. After the Earth team defeated Ra, O'Neil returns to Earth while Daniel Jackson stays on the planet. The series pilot, which takes place roughly one year after the events of the film, reveals that Ra was not the only alien to use Stargates to transport human slaves to many worlds for thousands of years.

Stargate SG-1 premiered on July 27, 1997, on the subscription channel Showtime. After five seasons on the same network, the Sci Fi Channel bought Stargate SG-1 and would air it for five further seasons, totalling to 214 episodes in ten seasons (seasons 1 through 7 consisted of 22 episodes each, and seasons 8 through 10 had 20 episodes each). Since the American broadcast splits each season to allow the production to catch up, the British channel Sky One aired the second part of some seasons before their American counterpart. Stargate SG-1's finale episode premiered in the United Kingdom on Sky One on March 13, 2007. The Sci Fi Channel concluded the tenth season on June 22, 2007. All seasons of Stargate SG-1 are available on DVD, and two direct-to-DVD Stargate films have continued the series, the first released in March 2008, the second in July 2008.

The cast of the first five seasons consisted of Richard Dean Anderson starring as Col. Jack O'Neill, Michael Shanks as Dr. Daniel Jackson, Amanda Tapping as Cpt./Maj. Samantha Carter (who would be promoted to Lieutenant-Colonel in Season 8 and to Colonel in the films), Christopher Judge as the Jaffa alien Teal'c, and Don S. Davis as Maj. Gen. George Hammond. Michael Shanks left the series after Season 5, and his function was assumed by Corin Nemec as the non-earth human Jonas Quinn in Season 6. Shanks continued to have a recurring role in season 6, rejoined the cast in Season 7, and stayed part of the main cast until the series' end. After Don S. Davis' departure from Stargate SG-1 after Season 7, Richard Dean Anderson's character was promoted to Brigadier General in Season 8; Anderson left the series' main cast after that season, but continued to appear periodically. Ben Browder and Beau Bridges replaced them as Lt. Col. Cameron Mitchell and Maj. Gen. Hank Landry in Season 9, respectively. The last actor to join the main cast was Claudia Black, who resumed her previously recurring role as Vala Mal Doran in Season 9.

Series overview

Episodes
Note: Episodes in bold are continuous episodes, where the story spans over 2 or more episodes.

Season 1 (1997–98)

Season 2 (1998–99)

Season 3 (1999–2000)

Season 4 (2000–01)

Season 5 (2001–02)

Season 6 (2002–03)

Season 7 (2003–04)

Season 8 (2004–05)

Season 9 (2005–06)

Season 10 (2006–07)

Movies 

After the SciFi Channel's decision to not renew Stargate SG-1 in 2006, the SG-1 producers and rights-holder MGM expressed a desire to continue SG-1 as a movie, mini-series, or an 11th season on another network. Brad Wright confirmed the production of two direct-to-DVD films in October 2006, which eventually became Stargate: The Ark of Truth and Stargate: Continuum. A special edition of the two-hour pilot episode "Children of the Gods" with re-edited scenes, all new visual effects, and a new score by Joel Goldsmith was released in July 2009. In April 2009, MGM confirmed a third new SG-1 film that Brad Wright had first announced in May 2008. However, this last project (entitled Stargate: Revolution) was put on hold and eventually got shelved permanently in 2011.

Home media

See also
List of Stargate Atlantis episodes
List of Stargate Universe episodes

Footnotes

References

External links

 Episode guide on IMDb.
 Episode guide  on GateWorld.

Stargate SG-1
 
Stargate SG-1
Stargate SG-1

it:Stargate SG-1#Episodi